Greeley Township is one of twelve townships in Audubon County, Iowa, United States. As of the 2010 census, its population was 170.

History
Greeley Township was organized in 1873.

Geography

References

External links
US-Counties.com
City-Data.com

Townships in Audubon County, Iowa
Townships in Iowa
1873 establishments in Iowa
Populated places established in 1873